The 1901 North Carolina A&M Aggies football team represented the North Carolina A&M Aggies of North Carolina College of Agriculture and Mechanic Arts during the 1901 college football season. In John McKee second season as head coach, the Aggies improved to a 1–2 record, although they lost both contests against rival, North Carolina.  They scored 27 points against their opponents and allowed 75.

Schedule

References

North Carolina AandM
NC State Wolfpack football seasons
North Carolina AandM Aggies football